Scooby-Doo! and the Samurai Sword is a 2009 direct-to-DVD animated comedy mystery martial arts film, as well as the thirteenth entry in a series of direct-to-video animated films based on the Scooby-Doo franchise. In the United States, the DVD sold 163,890 units in its first week and as of January 2014, it has sold approximately 524,725 units.

This is the last direct-to-video Scooby-Doo film to use the bright animation style keen to the What's New, Scooby-Doo? TV series, making it the last What's New, Scooby-Doo? related production. It was also the last Scooby-Doo production to feature Casey Kasem as the voice of Shaggy before his unofficial retirement in 2010 and subsequent death on June 15, 2014.

Plot
At a Tokyo museum of ancient history, Mr. Takagawa, the curator, and Kenji, a janitor, witness the resurrection of the evil Black Samurai, an ancient Japanese warrior whose armor was to be the museum's newest exhibit. The next day, the Mystery Inc. gang arrives in Tokyo, where Daphne has been invited to participate in a martial arts tournament at the prestigious Mirimoto Academy, run by Miss Mirimoto. The gang meet Daphne's friend Miyumi, who explains the difficulty of winning the tournament and entering the school as a student. After Daphne defeats Miss Mirimoto's bodyguard, Sojo, and almost defeats Miyumi, Mirimoto tells her she shows promise as a fighter. Also at the tournament is Mr. Takagawa, who warns Mirimoto that the Black Samurai has risen and will be after the Destiny Scroll, which is at the school. That night, during a feast, the Black Samurai and his Ninja warriors attack the school and steal the scroll. However, Mirimoto explains the scroll was only a copy, and shows the gang the real one.

Mr. Takagawa explains to the gang that the Black Samurai was an ancient warrior who asked the renowned swordsmith Masamune to craft a sword of great mystical power; Masamune agreed, but stated that the process would take a whole year. Masamune's evil apprentice Muramasa offered to make another sword in only half the time, which the Samurai accepted. However, Muramasa's evil nature passed into the blade, and when the Samurai took the sword, he was infected with the evil and transformed into the Black Samurai, wielding the Sword of Doom. When Masamune finished crafting his sword, the Sword of Fate, he presented it to the legendary Green Dragon. After a long battle in the sky, the Green Dragon defeated the Black Samurai and imprisoned him in the Sword of Doom. The Dragon then hid the Sword of Doom and marked its whereabouts within a riddle written on the Destiny Scroll.

Shaggy and Scooby-Doo unconsciously solve the riddle, and Mirimoto dispatches the gang, Miyumi and Mr. Takagawa to find the Sword of Doom before the Samurai. The gang finds the sword in a cave on an island in the Pacific Ocean, where they deal with a tribe living on the island and are attacked by the Black Samurai. During the fight, the Black Samurai is revealed to be Sojo. The gang brings Sojo back to  Mirimoto, but she and Miyumi capture them. Mirimoto explains that she staged the tournament to bring Mystery, Inc. to Japan so that they would find the Sword of Doom for her, and that she intends to use the Black Samurai to return Japan to the way it was in feudal times. The ninja army is revealed to be made up of robots, in which are equipped with the various fighting techniques of her students, including Daphne's. She then locks Fred, Daphne, Velma and Mr. Takagawa in the museum, but not before Daphne kicks the Sword of Doom from Mirimoto's hand into Scooby and Shaggy's possession.

Scooby and Shaggy manage to escape with the blade, but are chased by the ninja robots. They are saved by Matsuhiro, a sushi shop owner and Samurai, but the ninjas manage to reclaim the sword. Matsuhiro, who is aware of the legend, agrees to train Scooby and Shaggy as Samurai. He instructs them to pass through the gates of Earth, Wind, Fire and Water in order to find the Green Dragon and the Sword of Fate. After doing so, they find the Green Dragon, who takes them back to the museum to combat the Black Samurai. Kenji inadvertently frees Fred, Daphne, Velma and Mr. Takagawa, and they, with the aid of a repentant Miyumi, attempt to stop Sojo and Mirimoto from resurrecting the Black Samurai, but their plan fails and they are captured. After reviving the Black Samurai, Mirimoto tries to make him her servant, but the villain has no interest in her vision and knocks her out. Scooby and Shaggy arrive riding the Green Dragon and, with encouragement from Matsuhiro, Scooby uses the Sword of Fate to destroy the Sword of Doom; this breaks the Black Samurai's curse and renders him mortal once again. The grateful Samurai thanks the gang for freeing him before passing on to the afterlife. The gang later attends the newly renovated museum, where a statue of Scooby is erected in honor of him protecting Japan and the world.

Voice cast
 Frank Welker as Scooby-Doo, Fred Jones, Kerry Kilpatrick, and Mad Dog Masimoto
 Casey Kasem as Shaggy Rogers
 Mindy Cohn as Velma Dinkley
 Grey DeLisle as Daphne Blake, Sapphire Sonja
 Kelly Hu as Miyumi, Miss Mirimoto
 Sab Shimono as Mr. Takagawa
 Keone Young as Matsuhiro
 Kevin Michael Richardson as Sojo / The Black Samurai
 Gedde Watanabe as Kenji
 George Takei as Old Man Samurai 
 Brian Cox as The Green Dragon

References

External links
 

2009 films
2009 animated films
2009 direct-to-video films
2000s American animated films
American mystery films
Animated films set in Japan
Animated films set in Tokyo
Warner Bros. Animation animated films
Warner Bros. direct-to-video animated films
Samurai films
Scooby-Doo direct-to-video animated films
American children's animated comedy films
American children's animated mystery films
Japan in non-Japanese culture
2000s children's animated films
2000s English-language films